Gunn & Moore, commonly shortened to GM, is a sports equipment and apparel company founded in 1885 based in Colwick, Nottinghamshire, England that specialises in cricket. It became part of the Unicorn Group in 1968.

The company produces cricket clothing and equipment such as bats, balls, helmet, batting gloves, protective gear, athletic shoes, and bags.

Overview
Gunn & Moore was founded in 1885 by England Test batsman William Gunn and local businessman Thomas James Moore, and is most recognised for manufacturing cricket bats. The company also manufactures clothing and a full range of other cricket equipment.

The company was originally based at 49 Carrington Street in Nottingham.

Endorsements
Many professional cricketers have had endorsement deals with the company, including Ben Stokes (England), Dawid Malan (England), Aiden Markram (South Africa), Quinton de Kock (South Africa) and Ross Taylor (New Zealand), as well as former international captains Graeme Smith (South Africa), Steve Waugh (Australia), Stephen Fleming (New Zealand), Michael Vaughan (England) and Anil Kumble (India).

References

External links
 

British brands
Cricket equipment manufacturers
Manufacturing companies based in Nottingham
British companies established in 1885
Clothing companies established in 1885
Manufacturing companies established in 1885
Sport in Nottingham
Sporting goods manufacturers of the United Kingdom
Sportswear brands
Sports equipment
Companies based in Nottinghamshire
1885 establishments in the United Kingdom